The TAIAN TA580/TAS5380 is a 20-ton 8x8 special heavy duty truck developed and built by Taian Special Vehicle Manufactory and used by the People's Liberation Army of the People's Republic of China as a transport/Transporter erector launcher.

Description

The TA580/TAS5380 specializes in carrying ballistic missiles, large-caliber artillery rockets, radar equipment as well as other forms of military assets. Unlike the much larger Wanshan WS51200 and the WS21200, the TA580/TAS5380 cannot carry much larger intermediate-range ballistic missiles and intercontinental ballistic missiles.

Nevertheless, the TA580/TAS5380 has a maximum payload capacity of 20 tons, of which it primarily carries the HQ-9 air defense missile system.

The TA580/TAS5380 comes in two additional variants. The TA5382 accommodates an additional four passengers due to the presence of a double cab, as well as being able to mount the WM-80 and WM-120 artillery rocket system. The TA5501 is essentially a much larger variant with a 10x10 configuration, which offers better stability and mobility.

Platforms
 TAS5380A - 8x8 20 tonnes for the FT-2000 SAM system
 TAS5380SQ - 8x8 30 tonne TEL (WM-80 MRL)

See also 
 WS2400
 MAZ-7310
 HEMTT

References
 TA5380 Truck
 

Military trucks of China
Self-propelled anti-aircraft weapons of China
Military vehicles of the People's Republic of China